Isobutylgermane (IBGe, Chemical formula: (CH3)2CHCH2GeH3, is an organogermanium compound.  It is a colourless, volatile liquid that is used in MOVPE (Metalorganic Vapor Phase Epitaxy) as an alternative to germane. IBGe is used in the deposition of Ge films and Ge-containing thin semiconductor films such as SiGe in strained silicon application, and GeSbTe in NAND Flash applications.

Properties
IBGe is a non-pyrophoric liquid source for chemical vapor deposition (CVD) and atomic layer deposition (ALD) of semiconductors. It possesses very high vapor pressure and is considerably less hazardous than germane gas. IBGe also offers lower decomposition temperature (the onset of decomposition at ca. 325-350 °C)., coupled with advantages of low carbon incorporation and reduced main group elemental impurities in epitaxially grown germanium comprising layers such as Ge, SiGe, SiGeC, strained silicon, GeSb, and GeSbTe.

Uses
Rohm and Haas (now part of The Dow Chemical Company), IMEM, and CNRS have developed a process to grow germanium films on germanium at low temperatures in a Metalorganic Vapor Phase Epitaxy (MOVPE) reactor using isobutylgermane. The research targets Ge/III-V hetero devices.  It has been demonstrated that the growth of high quality germanium films at temperatures as low as 350 °C can be achieved.  The low growth temperature of 350 °C achievable with this new precursor has eliminated the memory effect of germanium in III-V materials. Recently IBGe is used to deposit Ge epitaxial films on a Si or Ge substrate, followed by the MOVPE deposition of InGaP and InGaAs layers with no memory effect, to enable triple-junction solar cells and integration of III-V compounds with Silicon and Germanium.
It was demonstrated that isobutylgermane could be also used for the growth of germanium nanowires using gold as catalyst

References

Further reading
 IBGe: Brief description from National Compound Semiconductor Roadmap.
Élaboration et Physique des Structures Épitaxiées (LPN) Hétérostructures III-V pour l’optoélectronique sur Si: Article in French from LPN-CNRS, France.
Designing Novel Organogermanium OMVPE Precursors for High-purity Germanium Films; Journal of Crystal Growth, January 25, 2006.
Ge Precursors for Strained Si and Compound Semiconductors; Semiconductor International, April 1, 2006.
Development of New Germanium Precursors for SiGe Epitaxy; Deo Shenai and Egbert Woelk, Presentation at 210th ECS Meeting, Cancun, Mexico, October 29, 2006.

External links
 Laboratoire de Photonique et de Nanostructures, LPN CNRS
 IMEM-CNR Institute

Semiconductors
Organogermanium compounds
Germanium(IV) compounds